In 1960, the major Holocaust perpetrator Adolf Eichmann was captured in Argentina by Israeli agents and brought to Israel to stand trial. His trial, which opened on 11 April 1961, was televised and broadcast internationally, intended to educate about the crimes committed against Jews, which had been secondary to the Nuremberg trials. Prosecutor and Attorney General Gideon Hausner also tried to challenge the portrayal of Jewish functionaries that had emerged in the earlier trials, showing them at worst as victims forced to carry out Nazi decrees while minimizing the "gray zone" of morally questionable behavior. Hausner later wrote that available archival documents "would have sufficed to get Eichmann sentenced ten times over"; nevertheless, he summoned more than 100 witnesses, most of them who had never met the defendant, for didactic purposes. Defense attorney Robert Servatius refused the offers of twelve survivors who agreed to testify for the defense, exposing what they considered immoral behavior by other Jews. Political philosopher Hannah Arendt reported on the trial in her book Eichmann in Jerusalem: A Report on the Banality of Evil.

Eichmann was charged with fifteen counts of violating the Nazis and Nazi Collaborators (Punishment) Law. His trial began on 11 April 1961 and was presided over by three judges: Moshe Landau, Benjamin Halevy, and Yitzhak Raveh. Convicted on all fifteen counts, Eichmann was sentenced to death. He appealed to the Supreme Court, which confirmed the convictions and the sentence. President Yitzhak Ben-Zvi rejected Eichmann's request to commute the sentence. In Israel's only judicial execution to date, Eichmann was hanged on 1 June 1962 at Ramla Prison.

Background 
From 1933 to 1945, the Jews in Europe faced systematic persecution and genocide at the hands of the Nazis in Germany and their collaborators in the Holocaust. From 1941 to 1945, this persecution increased as part of the Final Solution, a plan to murder all of the Jews in Europe, which resulted in the death of some six million Jews.

Eichmann played a major part in the execution of the Holocaust. He fled to Argentina at the end of the Second World War, but was abducted by Israeli Mossad agents in 1960, and transported to Jerusalem to stand trial. Eichmann was held at a fortified police station in Yagur in northern Israel for nine months prior to his trial.

Trial 
The trial of Eichmann was held from 11 April to 15 August 1961 at Beit Ha'am, a community theatre temporarily reworked to serve as a courtroom capable of accommodating 750 observers.

Charges
Counts 1–4 were for crimes against the Jewish people: 
Killing Jews, via the systematic deportation of millions of Jews to the extermination camps beginning in August 1941 
Placing Jews in living conditions calculated to bring about their physical destruction, by imprisoning them in concentration and extermination camps 
Causing serious bodily or mental harm to Jews 
Preventing births against Jews, with an order for forced abortions in Theresienstadt Ghetto 
Counts 5–7  were for crimes against humanity against Jews: 
Forced emigration of Jews from March 1938 to October 1941, deportation of Jews in October 1939 during the Nisko Plan, and his role in the Final Solution 
Persecuting Jews on national, religious, or political grounds 
The systematic plunder of the property of millions of Jews. Theft of property was not enumerated in the law as a crime against humanity (it was counted as a war crime), but the prosecution argued that it fit the criteria of "any other inhuman act committed against any civilian population" as stipulated in the law. Since Eichmann founded the Central Office for Jewish Emigration, which confiscated the property of deported Jews, and the court determined that the purpose of such confiscation was in part to instill terror and facilitate the deportation and murder of Jews, it found him guilty on this count.
Count 8 was for war crimes, based on Eichmann's role in the systematic persecution and murder of Jews during World War II. 

Counts 9–12 related to crimes against humanity against non-Jews: 
Mass deportations of Polish civilians 
Mass deportations of Slovene civilians
Participation in the Romani genocide by the systematic forced deportation of Romani people. Although the court did not find evidence that Eichmann knew that the Romani victims were sent to extermination camps, it nevertheless found him guilty on that count.
Participation in the Lidice massacre; he was found guilty for deportation of part of the population of Lidice, but not the massacre itself.
Counts 13–15 charged Eichmann with membership in enemy organizations, respectively the Schutzstaffeln der NSDAP (SS), Sicherheitsdienst des Reichfuehrers SS (SD), and Geheime Staatspolizei (Gestapo). He was found guilty on all three counts because he was not only proven to be a member of these organizations but committed crimes as part of his role, namely those discussed above.

References

Citations

Bibliography

Further reading

External links

 The Trial of Adolf Eichmann: Record of Proceedings
 The Eichmann Trial, Session no. 46 on YouTube
 "With Me Are Six Million Accusers" an online site marking the 50th anniversary of the Eichmann Trial
 "The Eichmann Trial: 50 Years After": selected documents from the Israel State Archives
 "Eichmann Prosecutor Interview: A Conversation with Justice Gabriel Bach, Senior Prosecutor in the Adolf Eichmann Trial" by Frank Tuerkheimer, Professor at the University of Wisconsin Law School
 "Adolf Eichmann in Israel: Portraits of a Nazi War Criminal", life.time.com
 The Devil's Confession: The Lost Eichmann Tapes—Official Web site of a documentary film 

1961 in case law
1961 in Israel
1962 in case law
1962 in Israel
Adolf Eichmann
Argentina–Israel relations
Crimes against humanity
Death penalty case law
Holocaust trials
Supreme Court of Israel
Trials in Israel
Universal jurisdiction